A Gaussian surface is a closed surface in three-dimensional space through which the flux of a vector field is calculated; usually the gravitational field, electric field, or magnetic field. It is an arbitrary closed surface  (the boundary of a 3-dimensional region ) used in conjunction with Gauss's law for the corresponding field (Gauss's law, Gauss's law for magnetism, or Gauss's law for gravity) by performing a surface integral, in order to calculate the total amount of the source quantity enclosed; e.g., amount of gravitational mass as the source of the gravitational field or amount of electric charge as the source of the electrostatic field, or vice versa: calculate the fields for the source distribution.

For concreteness, the electric field is considered in this article, as this is the most frequent type of field the surface concept is used for.

Gaussian surfaces are usually carefully chosen to exploit symmetries of a situation to simplify the calculation of the surface integral. If the Gaussian surface is chosen such that for every point on the surface the component of the electric field along the normal vector is constant, then the calculation will not require difficult integration as the constants which arise can be taken out of the integral. It is defined as the closed surface in three dimensional space by which the flux of vector field be calculated.

Common Gaussian surfaces 

Most calculations using Gaussian surfaces begin by implementing Gauss's law (for electricity):

Thereby  is the electrical charge enclosed by the Gaussian surface.

This is Gauss's law, combining both the divergence theorem and Coulomb's law.

Spherical surface 
A spherical Gaussian surface is used when finding the electric field or the flux produced by any of the following:
 a point charge
 a uniformly distributed spherical shell of charge
 any other charge distribution with spherical symmetry
The spherical Gaussian surface is chosen so that it is concentric with the charge distribution.

As an example, consider a charged spherical shell  of negligible thickness, with a uniformly distributed charge  and radius .  We can use Gauss's law to find the magnitude of the resultant electric field  at a distance  from the center of the charged shell. It is immediately apparent that for a spherical Gaussian surface of radius  the enclosed charge is zero: hence the net flux is zero and the magnitude of the electric field on the Gaussian surface is also 0 (by letting  in Gauss's law, where  is the charge enclosed by the Gaussian surface).

With the same example, using a larger Gaussian surface outside the shell where , Gauss's law will produce a non-zero electric field.  This is determined as follows.

The flux out of the spherical surface  is:

The surface area of the sphere of radius  is

which implies

By Gauss's law the flux is also

finally equating the expression for  gives the magnitude of the -field at position :

This non-trivial result shows that any spherical distribution of charge acts as a point charge when observed from the outside of the charge distribution; this is in fact a verification of Coulomb's law. And, as mentioned, any exterior charges do not count.

Cylindrical surface 
A cylindrical Gaussian surface is used when finding the electric field or the flux produced by any of the following:

 an infinitely long line of uniform charge
 an infinite plane of uniform charge
 an infinitely long cylinder of uniform charge

As example "field near infinite line charge" is given below;

Consider a point P at a distance  from an infinite line charge having charge density (charge per unit length) λ. Imagine a closed surface in the form of cylinder whose axis of rotation is the line charge. If  is the length of the cylinder, then the charge enclosed in the cylinder is

where  is the charge enclosed in the Gaussian surface. There are three surfaces a, b and c as shown in the figure.

The flux passing consists of the three contributions:

For surfaces a and b,  and  will be perpendicular.
For surface c,  and  will be parallel, as shown in the figure.

The surface area of the cylinder is

which implies

By Gauss's law

equating for  yields

Gaussian pillbox 
This surface is most often used to determine the electric field due to an infinite sheet of charge with uniform charge density, or a slab of charge with some finite thickness. The pillbox has a cylindrical shape, and can be thought of as consisting of three components: the disk at one end of the cylinder with area , the disk at the other end with equal area, and the side of the cylinder. The sum of the electric flux through each component of the surface is proportional to the enclosed charge of the pillbox, as dictated by Gauss's Law. Because the field close to the sheet can be approximated as constant, the pillbox is oriented in a way so that the field lines penetrate the disks at the ends of the field at a perpendicular angle and the side of the cylinder are parallel to the field lines.

See also

 Area
 Surface area
 Vector calculus
 Integration
 Divergence theorem
 Faraday cage
 Field theory
 Field line

References

Further reading

 Electromagnetism (2nd Edition), I.S. Grant, W.R. Phillips, Manchester Physics, John Wiley & Sons, 2008,

External links
 Fields - a chapter from an online textbook

Surfaces
Electrostatics
Carl Friedrich Gauss